Anthony Allen Shutt (born October 8, 1987) is an American football defensive back who is currently a free agent. He played college football for Florida A&M University. He was signed as a free agent by the Columbus Lions in 2013.

Professional career

Knoxville NightHawks
After going undrafted in the 2012 NFL Draft, Shutt signed with the Knoxville NightHawks of the Professional Indoor Football League (PIFL).

Columbus Lions
In 2013, Shutt signed with the Columbus Lions, also of the PIFL. At the conclusion of the 2013 season, he was named First Team All-PIFL and the PIFL Defensive Player of the Year.

Orlando Predators
Shutt was assigned to the Orlando Predators of the Arena Football League late in the 2013 season. He was placed on reassignment on March 31, 2015. He was once again assigned to the Predators on April 7, 2015. On December 29, 2015, Shutt was placed on recallable reassignment.

Tampa Bay Storm
Shutt was assigned to the Tampa Bay Storm on May 2, 2017. On June 29, 2017, Shutt was placed on reassignment. On July 20, 2017, Shutt was placed on league suspension.

References

External links
 Florida A&M bio
 

1987 births
Living people
American football defensive backs
Florida A&M Rattlers football players
Knoxville NightHawks players
Columbus Lions players
Orlando Predators players
Tampa Bay Storm players
Players of American football from Michigan
Sportspeople from Pontiac, Michigan